The Lost Patrol or Lost Patrol may refer to:

Music
 The Lost Patrol, a band from New York, or their self-title album
 The Lost Patrol Band, earlier name of Swedish punk band Invasionen, or their self-titled album
 "Lost Patrol", a song by Big Country on their album The Crossing

Films
 Lost Patrol (1929 film), a silent war film
 The Lost Patrol (1934 film), starring Victor McLaglen and Boris Karloff, remake of the 1929 film
 Delta Force One: The Lost Patrol, a 1999 film

Other
 Patrol (or Lost Patrol), a 1927 novel by Philip MacDonald which was adapted to the 1929 and 1934 films
 Lost Patrol (video game), a video game for the Commodore Amiga, Atari ST and DOS
 US Navy training Flight 19 which disappeared in December 1945
 The Lost Patrol (Canada), a 1910 Royal North-West Mounted Police patrol led by Inspector Francis J. Fitzgerald, all members of which died
 "The Lost Patrol", episode 37 of Exosquad
 Lost Patrol, a board game briefly published by Games Workshop in 2000, with a second edition released in 2016